Cate Blanchett is an Australian actress who has appeared extensively on screen and on stage. She made her stage debut in 1992 as Electra in the National Institute of Dramatic Art production of the play of the same name. She followed in 1993 with performances in Timothy Daly's Kafka Dances, for which she won the Sydney Theatre Critics Award for Best Newcomer, and the Sydney Theatre Company stage production of Oleanna, winning Best Actress. She is the first performer to win both awards at once. She went on to perform several roles on stage, notably Susan Traherne in Plenty (1999), Hedda Gabler in Hedda Gabler (2004), Blanche DuBois in A Streetcar Named Desire (2009), Yelena in Uncle Vanya (2011), and Claire in The Maids (2013).

Blanchett's first leading role on television came with 1994's Heartland, followed in 1995 with the miniseries Bordertown. In 1997, she made her feature film debut in a supporting role in the World War II drama Paradise Road. The same year, she had her first leading role in Oscar and Lucinda, which earned her an Australian Academy of Cinema and Television Arts Award nomination for Best Actress. In 1998, Blanchett received worldwide attention for playing Queen Elizabeth I of England in the acclaimed drama Elizabeth. She won Best Actress at the Golden Globe Awards and the BAFTA Awards for Best Actress, and was nominated for an Academy Award. Elizabeth and her next film, the 1999 thriller The Talented Mr. Ripley, performed well at the box office although her other 1999 releases, the widely praised An Ideal Husband and the largely panned Pushing Tin, were unsuccessful.

Blanchett found success portraying Galadriel in Peter Jackson's epic fantasy trilogy The Lord of the Rings (20012003). She won the Academy Award for Best Supporting Actress, among other honors, for portraying Katharine Hepburn in Martin Scorsese's 2004 drama The Aviator, making her the only actor to win an Oscar for portraying another Oscar-winning actor. She won the 2005 AACTA Award for Best Actress in a Leading Role for Little Fish. Blanchett's performance in the 2006 thriller Notes on a Scandal garnered her another Academy Award nomination, this time for Best Supporting Actress. In 2007, she received both Best Actress and Best Supporting Actress Oscar nominations for her roles in Elizabeth: The Golden Age and I'm Not There, becoming one of the few actors to achieve this.

In 2008, Blanchett appeared in Steven Spielberg's action adventure Indiana Jones and the Kingdom of the Crystal Skull and David Fincher's fantasy drama The Curious Case of Benjamin Button. She briefly played Galadriel in The Hobbit trilogy (20122014). For her lead performance in Woody Allen's 2013 drama Blue Jasmine, Blanchett won the Golden Globe, the BAFTA Award, the SAG Award, and the Academy Award for Best Actress. She voiced Valka in the 2014 animated fantasy How to Train Your Dragon 2 and its 2019 sequel How to Train Your Dragon: The Hidden World. In 2015, she received praise for playing Lady Tremaine in Disney's live action film Cinderella, Mary Mapes in Truth, and Carol Aird in Todd Haynes's romantic drama Carol. Cinderella was a box office success and Blanchett earned her seventh Oscar nomination for Carol. Blanchett made her Broadway debut in 2017 with The Present, receiving a nomination for the Tony Award for Best Actress in a Play. In 2017, she played primary villain Hela in Thor: Ragnarok. The following year, Blanchett starred in Ocean's 8, the all-women spin-off of the Ocean's trilogy, and Eli Roth's The House with a Clock in Its Walls. In 2020, Blanchett created and starred in the ABC television miniseries Stateless and portrayed Phyllis Schlafly in the Hulu miniseries Mrs. America.

Film

Stage

Television

Music videos

See also
 List of awards and nominations received by Cate Blanchett

Notes

References

External links
 
 

 
Actress filmographies
Australian filmographies